The 2017 FINA Women's Water Polo World League is the 14th edition of the annual women's international water polo tournament. It was played between November 2016 and June 2017 and open to all women's water polo national teams. After participating in a preliminary round, eight teams qualify to play in a final tournament, called the Super Final from 06 to 11 June 2017.

In the world league, there are specific rules that do not allow matches to end in a draw. If teams are level at the end of the 4th quarter of any world league match, the match will be decided by a penalty shootout. Teams earn points in the standings in group matches as follows:
 Match won in normal time - 3 points
 Match won in shootout - 2 points
 Match lost in shootout - 1 point
 Match lost in normal time - 0 points

Europe

Preliminary round
The European preliminary round consisted of two groups of three teams. The winner of each group after the home and away series of games qualifies for the Super Final. A third place is taken by the best scoring second-placed team.

Group A

Group B

Intercontinental Water Polo Tournament
May 2–7, 2017 Schaal Aquatics Center, Davis, United States

Group stage

Final stage

5th Place

3rd Place

Final

Super Final
June 6–11, 2017, Shanghai Oriental Sports Center, Shanghai, China 
In the Super Final the eight qualifying teams are split into two groups of four teams with all teams progressing to the knock-out stage.

Qualified teams

Group A
All times are CST (UTC+8)

Group B
All times are CST (UTC+8)

Knockout stage

Quarterfinals
 
All times are CST (UTC+8)

Semifinals
 
All times are CST (UTC+8)

Bronze medal match
 
All times are CST (UTC+8)

Final

All times are CST (UTC+8)

5th–8th Places

5th–8th Places Semifinals
 
All times are CST (UTC+8)

7th Place match

All times are CST (UTC+8)

5th Place match

All times are CST (UTC+8)

Final ranking

Team Roster
Gabby Stone, Maddie Musselman, Melissa Seidemann, Rachel Fattal, Mary Brooks, Maggie Steffens (C), Jordan Raney, Kiley Neushul, Aria Fischer, Jamie Neushul, Makenzie Fischer, Alys Williams, Mia Rycraw. Head coach: Adam Krikorian.

Individual awards

Most Valuable Player

Best Goalkeeper

Top Scorer
 — 15 goals
Media All Star Team

References

 Rules & Regulations

World League, women
FINA Women's Water Polo World League
FINA Women's Water Polo World League
International water polo competitions hosted by China